Sunchaser Pictures is a company formed by writer/director/producer Gavin Heffernan, based in Hollywood, California.

Filmography
The Steaks (2000)
Expiration (2004)
Santa Croce (2007)
Grand Wheel (2008)
Devolution (2010)
Devolution: Reckoning (2011)

Awards
 The collection of five Sunchaser short films Devolution won the Audience Choice award at the 2010 HollyShorts Film Festival in Los Angeles.
Grand Wheel premiered at SXSW Film Festival, screened at multiple festivals from 2008 to 2010, and won a Special Jury Prize for best cinematography at the Canadian Filmmakers' Festival for Sunchaser filmmakers Erik Forssell and Eric Koretz. The anti-war film was also presented with the Silver Bear at the 37th Festival of Nations in Austria, as well as Best Experimental Film at the 2009 Oxford Film Festival.
Expiration won Best Feature Film at the Canadian Filmmakers' Festival in 2004. EFilmCritic also named Gavin Heffernan Best New Filmmaker in 2004 for Expiration.

References

External links
 Sunchaser Pictures Official Website
Sunchaser Pictures at IMDB

Film production companies of the United States